webuyanycar.com is a car buying service with over 500 UK and 170 United States locations. UK headquarters are in Hook, Hart, Hampshire, England and United States headquarters are located in Media, Pennsylvania. The company has over 700 UK employees.

History
The company was founded in 2006 by Noel and Darren McKee with the aim of offering customers an alternative means of selling vehicles intended to be simpler than part exchange or sale.

By 2009, the company had bought 100,000 cars and was growing in popularity across the UK due to its first TV advertisement that featured a break-dancing newsreader and the webuyanycar.com jingle. Webuyanycar.com also celebrated opening its 100th branch in 2009.

In 2010, the company expanded into the market of buying vans, through the brand webuyanyvan.com.

In 2013, the company was sold to the used car marketplace, British Car Auctions (BCA). In 2015, BCA was floated on the UK stock market. During the same year, webuyanycar.com celebrated the opening of its 200th branch.

Four years later, in 2019, the company opened its 300th branch. In November 2019, private equity group TDR Capital completed the purchase of webuyanycar.com’s parent company, BCA, for a reported £1.9bn.

In September 2020, the company reached a significant milestone and bought its 2 millionth vehicle, just less than 4 years after celebrating 1 million purchases.

Advertising
Webuyanycar.com is well known for its advertisements that make use of repetitive beats and jingles.

From 2019 to 2022 they used TV presenter Phillip Schofield as the face of the brand.

Since 2022 they have done numerous adverts with the jingle Just Sold My Car To We Buy Any Car which is a parody of Its Friday then it Saturday Sunday What simply known as Friday by English DJ and Producer Riton Scottish house music project Nightcrawlers and Internet personalities Mufasa and Hypeman.

Research
Webuyanycar.com undertakes regular industry related research. Polling British motorists, the company produces numerous studies every year, revealing motoring trends and tracking motorists' habits.

In 2014, the company released the results of a mock Driving Theory Test on its website, revealing that six in ten drivers who sat the test, failed. The study showed that drivers in the 17-21 age group had the lowest pass mark of any age group, while drivers in the 46 to 65-year-old group had the highest pass rate.

Combining data collected from a freedom of information request and a poll of British motorists, webuyanycar.com found that an increasing number of motorists were relying on dash cam technology to protect themselves and to monitor other road users. At the time of the study, in May 2018, one in five motorists reported to be using a dash cam daily.

In late 2018, research conducted by the company found that seven in ten Britons spend 11 hours in their cars during the Christmas period. Revealing that on average, families travel 311 miles, just under the distance of London to Edinburgh, to see extended family over the festive period.  Collectively, British motorists travel over 5.9bn miles in cars over Christmas.

References 

Automotive companies of the United Kingdom
2006 establishments in the United Kingdom
Retail companies established in 2006
Used car market
Companies that filed for Chapter 11 bankruptcy in 2020